The 2015 Cerezo Osaka season was the club's fourth in the J2 League and first following their relegation from the 2014 J.League Division 1. The club finished in 4th place and advanced to the J2 League promotion playoffs, where they failed to achieve promotion after drawing Avispa Fukuoka 1–1 in the promotion playoff final. Avispa had finished in 3rd place and won the tiebreaker, which was based on the league standings instead of going to extra time after scoring an 87th-minute goal.

Cerezo Osaka lost in the first round of the Emperor's Cup to FC Osaka on 29 August in front of 4,467 spectators.

J2 League

References

External links
 J.League official site

Cerezo Osaka
Cerezo Osaka seasons